Dentsu Inc. ( Kabushiki-gaisha Dentsū or 電通 Dentsū for short) is a Japanese international advertising and public relations joint stock company headquartered in Tokyo. Dentsu is currently the largest advertising agency in Japan and the fifth largest advertising agency network in the world in terms of worldwide revenues.

Dentsu does business with almost every major institution in Japan, accounting for about 28 percent of the national advertising budget. Its connections to the government are so tight that The New York Times referred to Dentsu as "the unofficial communications department of the governing Liberal Democratic Party", and it has also been likened to the CIA on account of its reach.

History 
In 1906, Telegraphic Service Co. became . The next year, Japan Advertising Ltd. merged with Japan Telegraphic Communication Co., Ltd. to create advertising and communications operations. Japan Telegraphic Communication Co., Ltd. sold off its news division to Doumei News Agency in 1936 to change the company's focus to specialized advertising. In 1943, 16 companies were acquired in order to supplement Japan Telegraphic's advertising business. That same year, operational bases were established in Tokyo, Osaka, Nagoya, and Kyūshū. With the 1951 arrival of commercial radio broadcasting in Japan, the Radio Division was established at Japan Telegraphic's head and local offices.

In 1955, Japan Telegraphic Communication Co., Ltd. changed its name to Dentsu Inc. 1995 saw Dentsu creating five domestic regional subsidiaries.

Initial public offering 
Dentsu was listed on the Tokyo Stock Exchange in 2001. During the initial public offering of Dentsu, in December 2001, a trader at UBS Warburg, the Swiss investment bank, sent an order to sell 610,000 shares in this company at ¥6 each, while he intended to sell 16 shares at ¥600,000. The bank lost £71 million.

Dentsu's sales are more than double its nearest competitor, Hakuhodo or ADK, in the Japanese market, thanks to the company's origins as a media representative during the early part of the 20th century, producing the first newspaper advertisements as well as the first television commercials in Japan.

Geneon Entertainment 
In July 2003, Dentsu acquired Pioneer LDC from Pioneer Corporation and renamed it to Geneon Entertainment, while its North American division, Pioneer Entertainment, was renamed to Geneon USA.

On November 12, 2008, Dentsu announced that it was selling 80.1% of its ownership in Geneon to NBCUniversal's Universal Pictures International Entertainment (UPI), who planned to merge the company with its Universal Pictures Japan division to form a new company. The merger closed on February 1, 2009.

Aegis Group 
On 12 July 2012, Dentsu agreed to acquire British-based Aegis Group plc in a cash deal worth $4.9 billion. The deal was completed in March 2013. Dentsu Aegis Network, managed all Aegis Media work and non-Japanese Dentsu operations worldwide. In September 2020 Dentsu Group Inc. announced that its international business Dentsu Aegis Network will operate under the dentsu brand. This simplification has seen three lines of business established across media, customer relationship management, and creative. The business is registered as Dentsu International Limited with UK Companies House in October 2020.

Dentsu Ventures 

In April 2015, Dentsu announced the launch of its corporate venture capital fund, Dentsu Ventures, to provide companies across the U.S., Europe, and Asia with capital and business support. In the same month, Dentsu Ventures Global Fund I was launched with a total capital of five billion yen.

In May 2021, Dentsu Ventures Global Fund II was launched with a total capital of ten billion yen.

Dentsu Ventures investments include Cheddar, Clear Labs, Exo, GRAIL, Overtime, OpenWeb, Survios, Twist Bioscience, Tynker, and Upside Foods.

Corporate affairs

Project categorization 
Dentsu Inc. categorises project markets in four different parts: National advertisement market; Advertisement-related market; New market; Foreign market (in addition to Dentsu Aegis Network, its overseas subsidiary, which operates in over 120 countries). National advertisement market consists of media projects. Advertisement related projects consist of marketing services. New market consists of sport events advertisement. Foreign market contains above mentioned three categories in the foreign market.

Dentsu Building 

The Dentsu Building is a high-rise building in Shiodome, Minato, Tokyo, which houses Dentsu's corporate offices. With 48 floors that rise to 213.34 m (700 ft), it is the eleventh-tallest building in Tokyo. It was designed by Jean Nouvel, the French architect, and completed in 2002. It was built over the site of Tokyo's first railway station, and sits aside the Hamarikyu Gardens, formerly the site of a shōgun's vacation home.

Mount Fuji climbing tradition 
Since 1925, Dentsu employees have had a company tradition of climbing Mount Fuji. Every July all new staff and newly promoted executives climb Mt Fuji. Employees who are not physically able to do so are exempt. A former employee gave the reasoning behind this as: "The message is: 'We are going to conquer the one symbol that represents Japan more than anything else. And, once we do that, it will signify that we can do anything.

Overworking controversy 
In August 2015, Dentsu was caught exceeding its own 70-hour monthly maximum overtime limit.
In December Matsuri Takahashi, a University of Tokyo graduate and 24-year-old female employee of Dentsu, committed suicide. The Japanese government recognized her suicide as karoshi.
In July 2017, the company was charged by Japanese authorities for the death of Takahashi. No individuals were charged, only the corporation.
The company admitted allowing illegal levels of overtime and was convicted in October, paying ¥500,000 in fines.

Mr. Tadashi Ishii, Representative Director and President & CEO, notified Dentsu on December 28, 2016 that he will resign as Representative Director and President & CEO. His papers were sent to the prosecutors office because of the violation of the Labor Standards Act. Over a half century of ongoing overworking was documented by The New York Times, including training materials supporting a Dentsu president urging working "even if it kills you."

A 2017 attempt to encourage letting workers "leave the office at 3 p.m. on the last Friday of the month" did not get much participation. Also in 2017, a former executive creative director of Dentsu Japan has resigned from his own company following allegations he sexually harassed a woman during his tenure at the advertising giant.

Olympic bid rigging controversy 
In February 2023, Japan's competition regulator filed criminal complaints against six firms over the alleged bid-rigging of contracts for the Tokyo 2020 Olympics, one of those firms being Dentsu. The previous year, a former executive at Dentsu was arrested on suspicion of receiving bribes from Olympic sponsors.

Dentsu Group companies

Affiliates and shareholdings 
 Madhouse (minority shareholder)
 Vernalossom Co., Ltd. (minority shareholder)
 Shibuya-AX (joint venture)
 TNC (5.1%, minority shareholder)
 Video Research Ltd. (34.2%, leading shareholder)

Outside Japan 
 Lords Group (joint venture)
 Collett, Dickenson, Pearce & Partners (40% shareholder)

See also 

Liberal Democratic Party of Japan

References 
 Notes

 Sources

 Annual Report 2015 . Dentsu 2015.

Further reading 
 
 Kawashima, Nobuko. "Advertising agencies, media and consumer market: The changing quality of TV advertising in Japan." Media, Culture & Society 28#3 (2006): 393–410.
 Moriarty, Sandra, et al. Advertising: Principles and practice (Pearson Australia, 2014), Australian perspectives
 Sugiyama, Kotaro, and Tim Andree. The Dentsu Way: Secrets of Cross Switch Marketing from the World's Most Innovative Advertising Agency (2010)

External links
Official Website

 
2001 initial public offerings
Advertising agencies of Japan
Anime companies
Anti-communist organizations in Japan
Companies listed on the Tokyo Stock Exchange
Conservative media in Japan
Dentsu Aegis Network brands
Japanese companies established in 1901
Liberal Democratic Party (Japan)
Marketing companies established in 1901
Mass media companies of Japan
Mass media in Tokyo
Propaganda in Japan